Shekhar C. Mande is Structural and Computational Biologist. He was the Director General of the Council of Scientific and Industrial Research (CSIR), India, and the Secretary of the Department of Scientific and Industrial Research (DSIR), Ministry of Science and Technology.  Prior to this, he was the Director of National Centre for Cell Science, Pune.

He was awarded in 2005 the Shanti Swarup Bhatnagar Prize for Science and Technology, the highest science award in India,  in the Biological sciences category.

Early life and education
Mande completed his M.Sc. in Physics from University of Nagpur in 1984. In 1991, he earned his PhD in Molecular Biophysics, from the Indian Institute of Science, Bangalore. Following his PhD, he joined Wim G. J. Hol  as Postdoctoral researcher at Rijksuniversiteit Groningen in the Netherlands.

Career
Mande began his career at Dec 1995 at the Institute of Microbial Technology in Chandigarh. In September 2001, he moved to Centre for DNA Fingerprinting and Diagnostics in Hyderabad as a senior staff scientist. Between September 2011 and September 2018 He served as director at National Centre for Cell Science in Pune, India.

He served as a member of the management council of the Tata Institute of Fundamental Research (TIFR), Mumbai as a representative of the State Government of Maharashtra.  He used to be a member of the Management Councils of the Solapur University and the Savitribai Phule Pune University. He is a member of the Governing Body of the Indo-French Centre for Promotion of Advanced Research (CEFIPRA), and served as a member of the Research Council of the Institute of Genomics and Integrative Biology, Delhi. He used to be the Vice President of Vijnana Bharati, a large voluntary science movement in India with Swadeshi spirit.

Prior to moving to Delhi in October 2018 to handle Ministry of Science and Technology portfolios, Mande served on many advisory committees, including task forces of the Department of Biotechnology and Department of Science and Technology, Govt. of India.  He used to Chair the Basic Science task force of the Department of Biotechnology, and was a core member of the Biophysics, Biochemistry, Molecular Biology and Microbiology task force of the Science and Engineering Research Board of the Department of Science and Technology.

Until December 2019, he served as the chair the National Committee for the International Union of Crystallography for the Indian National Science Academy, New Delhi.

Research highlights
Structural Biologist and X-ray Crystallographer
Structural characterization of Mycobacterium tuberculosis proteins 
Computational analysis of genome-wide protein:protein interactions.

Prizes and honours
B M Birla Young Scientist Award (1999)
Wellcome Trust International Senior Fellow, 2003–08
Shanti Swarup Bhatnagar Prize for Science and Technology (2005)
Fellow, Indian National Science Academy New Delhi, Elected 2010
Fellow, National Academy of Sciences, Allahabad, India, Elected 2003
Fellow, Indian Academy of Sciences, Bangalore, Elected 2003
BC Guha Memorial Lecture of the Indian National Science Academy, 2017
BK Bachhawat Memorial Lecture of the National Academy of Science, India, 2017
Bharat Asmita Award of MIT-World Peace University, Pune (2019)
HK Firodia Vijnan Bhushan Award (2020)

References

External links

Living people
1962 births
20th-century Indian biologists
Council of Scientific and Industrial Research
Fellows of the Indian Academy of Sciences
Indian crystallographers
Indian Institute of Science alumni
Rashtrasant Tukadoji Maharaj Nagpur University alumni
University of Groningen alumni
University of Washington staff
Recipients of the Shanti Swarup Bhatnagar Award in Biological Science